Antennella is a genus of hydrozoans belonging to the family Halopterididae.

The genus has cosmopolitan distribution.

Species

Species:

Antennella allmani 
Antennella ansini 
Antennella armata

References

Halopterididae
Hydrozoan genera